Hal Mayforth is an American cartoonist and artist who has worked in the book illustration business. He received the National Cartoonists Society Magazine and Book Illustration Award in 1993.

References

American cartoonists
Living people
Year of birth missing (living people)
Place of birth missing (living people)